Oliver Hall (February 17, 1852 – November 25, 1946) was an American politician in the state of Washington. He served in the Washington State Senate for 28 years, from 1895 to 1902 and 1911 to 1932

References

Republican Party Washington (state) state senators
1852 births
1946 deaths